A Wintersunset... is the first album by the German band Empyrium.

Track listing

Personnel
 Ulf Theodor Schwadorf - all strings, vocals, percussions
 Andreas Bach - synthesizer

Additional personnel
 Nadine Mötler - flute
 Andreas Beck - engineering
 Christophe Szpajdel - logo
 R. Reichert - paintings
 Stefan Other - photography (band)

References

1996 debut albums
Empyrium albums